Glocca Morra was an American indie rock/emo band from Miami, Florida who later moved to Philadelphia, Pennsylvania.

History
Glocca Morra was formed in 2009 in Miami-Dade County, Florida by Zack Schwartz and JP Casanova, who attended high school together and played  in the band Set Fire To Failure. The band released their first full-length album, The Working Bones, A Health Decline on Livid Records with Arik Dayan on drums and Ruben Gallego on second guitar and synthesizers. According to Schwartz, he and JP met Dayan because he was their substitute teacher once in high school. Before leaving Miami to move to Philadelphia in 2009, the band recorded two EPs, one titled Fucking Miami, and another titled Museum Mouth.  In 2010, Glocca Morra released a split with The Greek Favourites on Make-Out Party Records called Songs in the Key of Ayyyyyy.

In 2010, the band began recording their second full-length album, Just Married, which was released in 2012. Its song "Irrevocable, Motherfucker" ranked 64 in "The 100 Greatest Emo Songs of All Time" list by Vulture.

In October 2011, Glocca Morra released an EP titled Ghoul Intentions with guitar player Nate Dionne of Snowing, who later joined the band full-time. In April 2012, Glocca Morra signed to Kind of Like Records and released an EP, An Obscure Moon Lighting An Obscure World. In 2013, Glocca Morra released a split with Summer Vacation. The band announced in March 2015 plans to release a final two song EP on Ice Age Records before breaking up. The EP songs finally released were "Wussy Pillow" and "Secret Drinker".

In January 2021, Zack Schwartz responded to a question on Spirit of the Beehive’s Instagram story asking if there were any plans for a Glocca Morra reunion. Schwartz responded that the band was "never getting back together."

References

External links

Glocca Morra at Discogs

Emo musical groups from Florida
Musical groups from Philadelphia
Musical groups established in 2009
Musical groups disestablished in 2015
Ice Age Records artists